The Treaty of Cardis was a peace settlement made in 1661 between Tsardom of Russia and the Swedish Empire. This particular agreement ended the Russo–Swedish War (1656–1658). It took place in Cardis Manor (nowadays Kärde) in Estonia. Based on the terms of the treaty, Russia surrendered to Sweden all captured territories. Moreover, all vessels constructed at Kokenhausen (Latvian: Koknese, Russian: Tsarevich-Dmitriev) for the failed Russian siege of Riga were destroyed (the vessels were constructed in a shipyard founded by a boyar named Afanasy Ordin-Nashchokin). Overall, the Peace of Cardis maintained the territorial accords of the Treaty of Stolbovo.

See also
List of treaties

References

External links
Under the Romanovs

Second Northern War
Northern Wars
Cardis
Cardis
1661 in Sweden
1661 treaties
17th century in Estonia
Jõgeva Parish
Cardis
Treaties of the Swedish Empire
Russia–Sweden treaties